Julie Ofsoski (born 4 April 1973) is a former basketball player from New Zealand who competed in the 2000 Summer Olympics and in the 2004 Summer Olympics.

References

1973 births
Living people
New Zealand women's basketball players
New Zealand expatriate basketball people in Australia
New Zealand people of Polish descent
Australian people of New Zealand descent
Olympic basketball players of New Zealand
Basketball players at the 2000 Summer Olympics
Basketball players at the 2004 Summer Olympics